Denis Joseph Cummings  (16 May 1885 – 31 March 1956) was a New Zealand policeman and police commissioner. He was born in Tuapeka Flat, South Otago, New Zealand, on 16 May 1885. He was the brother of James Cummings.

In the 1946 New Year Honours, Cummings was appointed a Commander of the Order of the British Empire.

References

1885 births
1956 deaths
New Zealand police officers
People from Otago
New Zealand Commanders of the Order of the British Empire